Brian Jones (1942–1969) was a multi-instrumentalist and founder of The Rolling Stones.

Brian Jones may also refer to:

Sportsmen

American football
Brian Jones (Canadian football linebacker) (born 1950), Canadian football linebacker
Brian Jones (American football linebacker) (born 1968), American football linebacker and radio host
Brian Jones (quarterback), (born 1980), American football quarterback
Brian Jones (tight end) (born 1981), American football tight end
Brian Jones (wide receiver) (born 1994), Canadian football wide receiver

Other sports
Brian Jones (rugby union) (born 1935), Wales international rugby union player
Brian Jones (golfer) (born 1951), Australian golfer
Brian Jones (sailor) (born 1959), New Zealand Olympic sailor
Brian Jones (basketball, born 1971), American college basketball coach
Brian Jones (basketball, born 1978), American basketball player

Others
Brian Jones (activist), American actor, educator and activist from New York
Brian Jones (aeronaut) (born 1947), English balloonist
Brian Jay Jones (born 1967), American biographer
Brian Jones (politician) (born 1968), member of the California State Senate
Brian Jones (intelligence analyst) (1944–2012), British metallurgist and intelligence analyst
Brian Jones (motorcycle designer) (1928–2001), British motorcycle designer
Brian Jones (poet) (1938–2009), British poet
Brian Keith Jones (born 1947), Australian convicted child sex offender

See also
Bryan Jones (disambiguation)